XHPCHQ-FM is a radio station on 91.3 FM in Chetumal, Quintana Roo. It is owned by Grupo Turquesa and known as Haahil FM.

History
XHPCHQ was awarded in the IFT-4 radio auction of 2017 and was the only one of three Chetumal frequencies that was ultimately won in the auction. Grupo Turquesa paid 41.4 million pesos. The station signed on January 11, 2019.

References

External links

Radio stations in Quintana Roo
Radio stations established in 2019
2019 establishments in Mexico